Alwarpet  is a  residential zone in central Chennai and is a part of the greater Teynampet region. It is surrounded by Teynampet in the north and east, Mylapore, Mandavelli and Abhiramapuram in the east, Raja Annamalaipuram in the south, Nandanam in the south-west. It is among the most upscale neighborhoods in Chennai. The geographical location of this area allows centralized access to all parts of the city, hence it is typically called as "Heart of Chennai". The nearest Metro station is Teynampet metro station. A new exclusive station for Alwarpet has been proposed under the Phase-II of Chennai Metro Rail Project which is likely to begin by March 2021 and expected to be completed within 5-7 years.

Alwarpet is home to the actor Kamal Haasan, which he acknowledged in his song 'Alwarpetta Aandava Vettiya pottu thaandava' from the movie Vasool Raja MBBS. Chennai Super Kings owner and India Cements Managing Director, N. Srinivasan resides in Alwarpet (Boat Club) too. This residential area is situated just adjacent to Poes Garden, which is home to two of the most important personalities of Chennai, actor Rajnikanth and the late Chief Minister of Tamil Nadu J. Jayalalitha. The Boat Club Road adjoining Alwarpet and Raja Annamalaipuram is the third most expensive locality in India and the most expensive in South India.

References 

 Neighbourhoods in Chennai